Dave Warner is a strongman competitor from Ballymoney, Northern Ireland. He has also competed in Highland Games and Armwrestling. He is a four-time winner of Ireland's Strongest Man, and a two-time winner of Northern Ireland/Ulster's Strongest Man. Warner is a member of the Irish Strength Association Hall of Fame.

References

Living people
Strength athletes from Northern Ireland
British strength athletes
People from Ballymoney
1969 births